Missing Link is a 2019 American stop-motion animated adventure comedy film written and directed by Chris Butler. The film is produced by Laika and stars the voices of Hugh Jackman, Zoe Saldana, David Walliams, Stephen Fry, Matt Lucas, Timothy Olyphant, Amrita Acharia, Ching Valdes-Aran, Emma Thompson, and Zach Galifianakis. Set in the Pacific Northwest, the plot follows Mr. Link, a Sasquatch who, with the help of British explorers Sir Lionel Frost and Adelina Fortnight, travels to the Himalayas to meet his Yeti cousins.

Development on a new stop-motion Laika animated film on "Film Five" began in April 2018, with Butler to direct and write the project and the voice cast announced. Annapurna Pictures distributed the film in the United States, who brought their distributor rights. In May 2018, additional voice cast were announced, with the title being revealed. By June 2018, Laika announced that Missing Link would be released in April 2019. Production was reportedly underway by May 2018 with Laika's artists having constructed over 110 sets with 65 unique locations for the film. AGC International acquired the international distribution rights to the film. Carter Burwell compose the film's musical score. With an budget of $100 million, Missing Link is the most expensive film ever made from Laika and the most expensive stop-motion animated film of all time.

Missing Link premiered in New York City on April 7, 2019, and was theatrically released in the United States on April 12, 2019 by Annapurna Pictures through United Artists Releasing. Missing Link is Laika's first film not to be distributed by Focus Features. Although it was a box-office failure, grossing $26.2 million against its $102.3 million production budget, losing $101.3 million, the film received positive reviews from critics, who praised its animation, voice-over performances, humor and light-hearted standards compared to other Laika works, although some drew criticism towards the writing. It won the Golden Globe Award for Best Animated Feature Film, making it the first non-computer animated film to win in the category, and the first non-CGI animated film to win a Golden Globe since Waltz with Bashir (2008). It also received a nomination at the 92nd Academy Awards for Best Animated Feature, but lost to Toy Story 4.

Plot
In 1886, Sir Lionel Frost, a struggling investigator of mythical creatures, continuously searched for different creatures to study and announce their presence in the world, which would allow him to be accepted into the "Society of Great Men", which is led by Sir Lionel's rival, Lord Piggot-Dunceby. Lionel receives a letter acknowledging the presence of a Sasquatch, making a deal with Piggot-Dunceby that would allow him to join the society if he proved that the creature was real.

Lionel travels to the Pacific Northwest, eventually stumbling upon the Sasquatch in a forest. After dubbing him "Mr. Link", Lionel is told by the Sasquatch that he was, in fact, the one who sent the letter. Mr. Link requests Lionel's help in finding his relatives, the Yetis, in the Himalayas. Lionel agrees to help him but is unaware of the fact that Piggot-Dunceby has hired a bounty hunter named Willard Stenk to track Lionel and kill him, ensuring that the pro-imperialist conservative views of the society remain unchallenged.

Lionel's old lover Adelina Fortnight has a map to the Himalayas locked at her house in Santa Ana, California, in a safe that belonged to her late husband, one of Lionel's past partners, so the two visit her mansion to acquire it. However, Adelina harbors resentment for Lionel missing her husband's funeral and kicks him out when he offers to pay her for the map. Lionel and Mr. Link come back later at night and break in, but Mr. Link's noise-making awakens Adelina, who fires at the intruders and instead creates a hole in the safe. Mr. Link pushes the safe out of the top-floor window. Mr. Link and Lionel grab the map and escape but are discovered the next day by Adelina, who allows them to search for the Yetis as long as she is there to accompany them. Stenk arrives, and a shootout ensues, but the trio tricks their pursuer into hopping on the train to search for them.

The trio makes their journey via boat, and Adelina pressures Lionel into reaching out to Mr. Link to prove his sincerity. Lionel enjoys a heartwarming talk with Mr. Link on the boat's deck, where Mr. Link gives himself the name "Susan" after a friendly prospector he once encountered. However, they are once again ambushed by Stenk. After various scuffles across different parts of the ship, the trio eventually locks Stenk in the boat's boarding rooms while they make another escape.

The trio eventually makes their way to the Himalayas and is pointed in the direction of the Yeti temple, and led to their Queen, who reveals their secluded valley to the group. She then reveals their disdain for mankind extends to Susan, who's interacted closely with them. They throw the trio in a pit for them to stay until they die, where Adelina confronts Lionel on his need for the Society's acceptance being similar to Susan's rejection by the yetis. Susan hoists up Adelina enough to knock down a few Yeti guards, allowing them to stack them and escape. They run across the ice bridge, where an armed Piggot-Dunceby, his assistant Mr. Collick and Stenk are waiting at the center of the bridge. Lionel denounces his rival's pride and defends Susan as more human than Piggot-Dunceby ever will be. As a result, the insane Piggot-Dunceby starts firing his rifle at the ice bridge to kill the trio, until Susan stops Piggot-Dunceby from getting any further, still causing it to crack and break. Piggot-Dunceby and Collick fall to their deaths while the trio and Stenk make a run for it. They are too late and are left hanging on the edge of the destroyed ice bridge. Stenk, who has made it all the way across, taunts Lionel, which leads to the two engaging in a slapping fight while hanging on the bridge. The trio works together to rid themselves of Stenk, who falls to his death after an icicle breaks and falls on him. Lionel appoints Susan as his new partner in investigations.

After arriving home, Adelina tells Lionel that she will be adventuring on her own for a while and departs, but not before the pair share a brief mutual acceptance of their feelings for each other. Susan and Lionel arrive back at the latter's work space and begin their next case to find Atlantis. After they leave, the end credits reveal maps and souvenirs of their subsequent adventures.

Voice cast

Old Worlders voiced by Leila Birch, Jean Gilpin, Peter Lavin, Tom Muggeridge, Jimmy Hibbert, David Holt, Christopher Neame, Moira Quirk, Maebel Rayner, Alexander James Rodriguez, Julian Stone, and Nick Toren.

New Worlders voiced by Kirk Baily, David Beron, William Calvert, David Cowgill, Kerry Gutierrez, Bridget Hoffman, Scott Menville, Erin Myles, Juan Pacheco, Paul Pape, André Sogliuzzo, and Scott Whyte.

Himalayan villagers voiced by Phal Tong Lama, Yangchen Dolkar Gakyil, and Tharlam Dolma Wolfe.

Production
On April 25, 2018, it was announced that Laika had begun development on "Film Five," a new animated film written and directed by Chris Butler and starring Hugh Jackman, Zoe Saldana, and Zach Galifianakis. The film was set to be distributed by Annapurna Pictures in the United States. On May 7, 2018, it was announced that the film had been titled Missing Link and that additional voice actors would include Stephen Fry, Emma Thompson, Timothy Olyphant, Matt Lucas, David Walliams, Ching Valdez-Aran, and Amrita Acharia.

Production was reportedly underway by May 2018 with Laika's artists having constructed over 110 sets with 65 unique locations for the film.

Music

On October 9, 2018, Carter Burwell was confirmed to score music for the film. The soundtrack was released on April 12, 2019 by Lakeshore Records, the same day as the theatrical release.

Track listing

Release
The film was released in the United States on April 12, 2019 by United Artists Releasing, Annapurna Pictures and Metro-Goldwyn-Mayer's joint distribution company, making it Laika's first film not to be distributed by Focus Features.

Internationally, the distribution rights to the film were acquired by AGC International, who pre-sold the movie to distribution companies like Lionsgate for the United Kingdom, Metropolitan Filmexport for France, Elevation Pictures for Canada, Roadshow Films for Australia and New Zealand, Entertainment One for Germany and Spain, Leone Film Group for Italy, Appaluse Entertainment for Taiwan, GAGA for Japan, ISU C&E for South Korea, Selim Ramia for the Middle East, The Searchers for Benelux, Mis. Label for Scandinavia, Vertical Entertainment for Eastern Europe and Buena Vista International for Latin America, Russia, Malaysia and Singapore.

Home media
20th Century Fox Home Entertainment released the film in the United States on digital on July 9, 2019 and on Blu-ray and DVD on July 23, 2019.

Reception

Box office
Missing Link grossed $16.6 million in the United States and Canada, and $9.6 million in other territories, for a worldwide total of $26.2 million. Deadline Hollywood calculated the net loss of the film to be $101.3million, when factoring together all expenses and revenues.

In the United States and Canada, the film was released alongside Little, Hellboy, and After, and was projected to gross around $10 million from 3,314 theaters in its opening weekend. However, after grossing $1.6 million on its first day (including $230,000 from Thursday night previews), it went on to debut to $5.9 million, finishing ninth at the box office and marking the 12th-worst opening for a film playing in over 3,000 theaters, the worst opening for a film playing in over 3,150 theaters, and the lowest start for a Laika film ever. In its second weekend the film dropped 27% to $4.4 million, finishing ninth.

Critical response
The website's critical consensus reads, "Another beautifully animated triumph for Laika, Missing Link is a visual treat with lots of humor, plenty of heart, and even a little food for thought." On Metacritic, the film has a weighted average score of 68 out of 100, based on 30 critics, indicating "generally favorable reviews". Audiences polled by CinemaScore gave the film an average grade of "B+" on an A+ to F scale, while those at PostTrak gave it an overall positive score of 81% and a "definite recommend" of 63%.

Peter Debruge of Variety wrote: "Sooner or later, Laika was bound to branch out, which makes this funnier, more colorful film the link previously missing between the company's Goth-styled past and whatever comes next."
John Nugent of Empire Magazine praised the film, calling it "a charming family-friendly story about adventure and friendship—told with bar-raising artistic craft and technical skill. We'd expect nothing less from Laika."

Accolades

See also 
 Smallfoot (2018)
 Abominable (2019)

References

External links

 
 

2010s American animated films
2010s stop-motion animated films
2019 animated films
2019 films
American animated feature films
Annapurna Pictures films
Best Animated Feature Film Golden Globe winners
Bigfoot films
Films about cryptids
Films about Tibet
Films based on urban legends
Films scored by Carter Burwell
2010s monster movies
Films set in 1886
Films set in London
Films set in Washington (state)
Laika (company) animated films
Films about Yeti
2010s English-language films
2010s American films